Fünfseen is a municipality in the Mecklenburgische Seenplatte district, in Mecklenburg-Vorpommern, Germany. It is administered by the Amt Malchow based in the city of the same name.

Fünfseen was established by merging former independent communities Adamshoffnung, Grüssow, Kogel, Rogeez and Satow by 1 January 2005. Other neighborhood are Bruchmühle, Lenz-Süd, Neu Grüssow, Petersdorf and Satow Hütte.

References

Municipalities in Mecklenburg-Western Pomerania